John Andrew "Jack" Kelly (November 30, 1943 – June 28, 1978) was an American investigative journalist in Boston, Massachusetts, and he was one of the victims of the Blackfriars Massacre.

Early life
Kelly was born in the Drexel Hill suburb of Philadelphia to Francis G. Kelly (1901–1966) and Rose M. (née Lally) Kelly (1908–1973). His sister Kathleen was born in 1946. Francis Kelly was a salesman for Corn Products, which led the family to move to Manchester, New Hampshire in 1949. In 1952, the family settled in Brighton, Massachusetts and his father continued to work for Corn Products in South Boston. In Brighton, Kelly attended St. Columbkille School, where he was inspired to write "The Sisters and the Kids, a humorous story about parochial school life, published in 1973 in The Boston Globe Magazine in 1973.

Military service
After graduating St. Columbkille School, Kelly joined the U.S. Air Force and left for basic training at Lackland AFB, on July 1, 1961, aged 17. After, he was deployed to what was then Formosa, where he started his radio career in Armed Forces Radio. After returning to the United States he was stationed in Maryland. Upon his honorable discharge from the US Air Force, he took a job with Metropolitan Life Insurance and married Michele Larichiuta in 1964.

Career
In 1967, the family moved to Brighton, Massachusetts, where he worked for Ross Laboratories. In 1968, he joined WCAS (AM) as a reporter and producer of documentaries. In 1969, while working for WEZE, Kelly won an area wide reputation for hard hitting investigative reporting, including the first story on Senator Edward Kennedy's involvement in the Chappaquiddick incident three hours before any other station in the country had the story. In 1970, he joined WBZ (AM) News, where he significantly contributed as investigative reporter for several years, earning awards for excellence in reporting from United Press International. Kelly joined WNAC-TV in 1974 as an investigative reporter.

Death
John Kelly died in the Blackfriars Massacre in 1978, aged 34. He was survived by his wife, four children, and one sister.

See also
List of journalists killed in the United States
List of unsolved murders

References

External links
 thebrothersbulger.com
 thephoenix.com

1943 births
1978 deaths
1978 murders in the United States
20th-century American non-fiction writers
20th-century American journalists
20th-century American male writers
American male journalists
American reporters and correspondents
Deaths by firearm in Massachusetts
Journalists from Pennsylvania
Male murder victims
Mass murder victims
Murdered American journalists
People from Drexel Hill, Pennsylvania
People murdered by the Patriarca crime family
People murdered in Massachusetts
Radio personalities from Philadelphia
Unsolved murders in the United States
Writers from Boston